Tata Institute of Social Sciences (TISS) is a multi-campus public research university in Mumbai, India. It is Asia's oldest institute for professional social work education and was founded in 1936 in then Bombay Presidency of British India as the Sir Dorabji Tata Graduate School of Social Work by the Sir Dorabji Tata Trust. In 1944, the institute was officially renamed as the Tata Institute of Social Sciences and in 1964, the Government of India declared TISS as deemed university under Section 3 of the University Grants Commission Act (UGC), 1956.

In 1954, TISS moved to a permanent campus at Deonar, Mumbai (now known as the Main Campus), from the earlier campuses at Nagpada and then Andheri. In 2001, the Deonar campus was expanded to include the Malti Jal and Jal A. D. Naoroji Campus Annexe, which are now commonly known as the New Campus. TISS, in 1986, established a rural campus in Tuljapur, Maharashtra and two off-campuses in Guwahati and Hyderabad in 2011. In addition to these campuses, TISS offers teaching, training, research, and development support from centres established across India including in Leh, Ladakh and Port Blair, the Andaman and Nicobar.

TISS's academic programs focus on the social sciences and offers doctoral degrees in Management and Labour Studies, Disaster Studies, Development Studies, Education, Gender Studies, Health Studies, Law, Media and Cultural Studies, Public Policy, Rural Development and Social Work. Since its inception TISS has had a focus on field action including in responding to disasters such as the Partition of India, the Bhopal disaster and Uttarakhand floods. Several TISS initiatives have shaped public policy in India, such as India's labour welfare laws. Notable organizations and personalities have been appreciative of TISS's social service work including Eleanor Roosevelt, Jawaharlal Nehru, Niels Bohr and the United Nations, among others.

History

TISS (Tata Institute of social sciences) - India's first premier institute for social work was established in the year 1936, as the Sir Dorabji Tata Graduate School of Social Work. It was renamed to its current name in 1944. It was recognised as a Deemed University in 1964 by the University Grants Commission of India. TISS started out as a small institute offering a post-graduate diploma in Social Work, but has since expanded continuously in terms of educational programmes and infrastructure . The first director of the institute was Clifford Manshardt, who aimed to establish a post-graduate social work school of national stature that would engage in a continuous study of Indian social issues and create meaningful interventions.

Over the years, the institute has, among other thrusts, made a significant contribution to policy, planning, action strategies and human resource development. It has done so in several areas, ranging from sustainable rural and urban development to education, health, communal harmony, human rights and industrial relations. TISS has earned recognition as an institution of repute from different Ministries of the Government of India and various State Governments, as well as international agencies such as the United Nations, and the non-government sector, both national and international.

Academic collaborations 
The Tata Institute of Social Sciences has a history of collaboration with institutions in India. The institute also has academic and research collaborations with other institutes and universities including University of Chicago, London School of Economics, Massachusetts Institute of Technology, Sciences Po,  and 12 universities under the Erasmus Mundus program.

London School of Economics and Political Science research collaboration, was launched at LSE in June 2007. The programme is undertaken in two streams, namely, Social Sciences and Health. The research themes developed in Social Sciences have been in various Centres and Departments at LSE together with TISS such as Business Model Innovation at the Base of the Pyramid, Civil Society and Global Governance, Colonialism and Welfare: Social Policy and the British Imperial Legacy, Democracy and Development, Governance and the Governed, Population and Development, Social Protection, Economic Growth and Social Change, and Urban Planning & Development.

Campuses and schools

Campuses 
There are four campuses of TISS, located in Mumbai, Tuljapur, Hyderabad and Guwahati.

Mumbai 

TISS was established in 1936 as Sir Dorabji Tata Graduate School of Social Work in Mumbai. It was renamed to its current name Tata Institute of Social Sciences in 1944. TISS Mumbai is the main campus of the TISS. In the year 1964, it was declared Deemed to be a university under Section 3 of the University Grants Commission Act (UGC), 1956. TISS Mumbai provides various M.A., M.Phil & Ph.D programs. Over the years, TISS Mumbai is well known for its contribution through research in social work, social sciences, human resources management & health systems.

In 2014, TISS introduced the Secular Ethics for Higher Education credit course in Mumbai. The inauguration was attended by the Dalai Lama, who was reported to have stated that, "Since women have been shown to be more sensitive to others’ suffering, their leadership may be more effective. His Holiness suggested it's time for men to withdraw and for women to step forward."

Tuljapur 
TISS Tuljapur in Osmanabad district of Maharashtra was set up with support from the Government of Maharashtra in 1986. The campus houses the School of Rural Development with several centres. It is a 100-acre campus located in the outskirts of Tuljapur. The campus has commenced offering the Five Year Integrated Masters programme since 2012 which was discontinued since 2018. It has a computer centre, library, gymnasium, girls and boys hostels, guest house, faculty and staff quarters.

The initial focus of the institute on rural development projects and field action has widened to include academic activities with grass root level involvement both by faculty and students in the last 7 years.

TISS Tuljapur offers bachelor's in social sciences and social work and master's level courses in Social Work Rural Development, Development Policy, Planning & Practices, Social Innovation and Entrepreneurship, Sustainable Livelihoods, Natural Resources Management And Governance.
It also offers a year long post graduate diploma course in water and sanitation(WASH)

Hyderabad 

TISS Hyderabad came into being with the approval of Academic Council and Governing Board of TISS. The Registrations under Societies Registrations Act and Public Trust Act of the TISS Mumbai are valid for TISS Hyderabad as well. TISS Mumbai provides oversight to matters of admission, instruction, evaluation of TISS Hyderabad and confers TISS degrees. Currently, it operates from two campuses: one in Alimineti Madhava Reddy Andhra Pradesh Academy of Rural Development (AMR-APARD) in Rajendranagar, and the other in Roda Mistry School of Social Work in Gachibowli.

At the invitation of the Government of Telangana, TISS is in the process of setting up a 100 acres campus in Kothur Mandal, Mahabubnagar district.

Guwahati 
TISS Guwahati has been set up at the behest of the government of Assam and the Ministry of Department of North East Region, Government of India. TISS Guwahati has been contributing to the development sector in the North East through a well-conceived Diploma Programme in Community Organisation and Development Practice since June 2009. Currently, TISS Guwahati is operating out of an interim campus in the heart of the city in Guwahati.

TISS Guwahati commenced offering the Five Year Integrated Masters programme from 2012 until 2017 along with two years master's degree programme in Social Work and Ecology, Environment and Sustainable Development. Now the integrated degree has been changed into 3 year bachelor's course. Several new academic programmes are being offered beyond the existing programmes from the academic year 2014–15.

The campus space is equipped with a cyber library, conference hall, and classrooms with provisions for video conferencing. Student hostels separately for men and women are available. These are managed and maintained by TISS. A full-fledged campus is being established on 15 acres of land located within the Assam Engineering College campus.

Governance
The institute has a governing board nominated by the Government of India, Government of Maharashta, the University of Mumbai and the University Grants Commission along with representatives from the institute faculty. S. Ramadorai, vice chairman, TCS and Advisor to the Prime Minister of India, is the current honorary chairperson of TISS. The chairperson of the governing board has functions similar to that of the chancellor of a conventional university. The academic council decides matters of academic nature and comprises faculty drawn from the institute's 4 campuses and as well as 6 external experts.

Director 

The director of the institute acts as both the academic and administrative head. This position is similar to that of the vice-chancellor of any university. From February 2018, Shalini Bharat serves as director.

Deputy Directors 

The deputy director (equivalent to post of pro-vice-chancellor) is the academic head of the institute.
 TISS Mumbai Academics is headed by Director Prof Shalini Bharat and Research Wing is headed by Deputy Director Prof Surinder Jaswal.
 TISS Hyderabad is headed by Deputy Director (Acting) Prof Aseem Prakash.
 TISS Guwahati is headed by Deputy Director (Acting) Prof Kalpana Sarathi.
 TISS Tuljapur is headed by Dean Prof Ramesh Jare.

Rankings

The National Institutional Ranking Framework (NIRF) ranked Tata Institute of Social Sciences 57th overall in India and 34th among universities in India in 2020.

Notable faculty and alumni

Faculty 
Madhav Sadashiv Gore, responsible for the development of social science research and consolidation of TISS
Sanjay Barbora, sociologist

Alumni 

Medha Patkar, Social Activist
Anu Aga, Former Chairman, Thermax
Purnima Mane, President and CEO, Pathfinder International
Subhash Mendhapurkar, Social Activist
Jeroo Billimoria, Social Entrepreneur 
Shoba Raja, Social Activist
Munmun Dhalaria - Filmmaker
Lalita Iyer, author.

References

External links
 

 
1936 establishments in India
Economics schools
Economics schools in India
Schools of social work
Educational institutions established in 1936
Research institutes in Mumbai
Universities and colleges in Mumbai
Tata institutions
Deemed universities in Maharashtra